New Dawn is a 1999 French drama film directed by Émilie Deleuze. It was screened in the Un Certain Regard section at the 1999 Cannes Film Festival.

Cast
 Samuel Le Bihan - Alain
 Marcial Di Fonzo Bo - Manu
 Catherine Vinatier - Pascale
 Claire Nebout - Isabelle
 Fabien Lucciarini
 Candice Dufour

References

External links

1999 films
1999 drama films
French drama films
1990s French-language films
Films directed by Émilie Deleuze
1990s French films